is a town located in Fukushima Prefecture, Japan. , the town had an estimated population of 17,471 in 6348 households, and a population density of 240 persons per km2.

Geography
Miharu is located in Tamura District in north-central Fukushima prefecture. The town is located in an hilly region of the Abukuma Mountains, with peaks of 300–500 meters. 
Lakes: Miharu Dam

Neighboring municipalities
 Fukushima Prefecture
 Kōriyama
Tamura
 Nihonmatsu
 Motomiya

Demographics
Per Japanese census data, the population of Miharu has declined modestly from 1960 levels.

Climate
Miharu has a humid continental climate (Köppen Cfa) characterized by mild summers and cold winters with heavy snowfall.  The average annual temperature in Miharu is 11.3 °C. The average annual rainfall is 1282 mm with September as the wettest month. The temperatures are highest on average in August, at around 24.2 °C, and lowest in January, at around -0.3 °C.

History
The area of present-day Miharu was part of ancient Mutsu Province. During the Edo period, the area was the castle town of Miharu Domain, a 50,000 koku han ruled by the Akita clan from 1645 until the Meiji Restoration. It was subsequently organized as part of Nakadōri region of Iwaki Province.

Miharu town was established with the formation of the modern municipalities system on April 1, 1889. On April 1, 1955, Miharu annexed the neighboring villages of Ogisawa, Nakazuma, Nakago, Sawaishi and Kurita, all from Tamura District.

Economy
The economy of Miharu is primarily agricultural, with some chemical and light manufacturing.

Education
Miharu has six public elementary schools and one public junior high school operated by the town government, and one public high school operated by the Fukushima Board of Education.
Fukushima Prefectural Tamura High School

Transportation

Railway
JR East - Ban'etsu East Line

Highway
 Ban-etsu Expressway

International relations
 - Sister city to Rice Lake, Wisconsin, United States, since August 21, 1987.   Sister city relationship was spearheaded by Phyllis and Jeana Schieffer.  Jeana was employed by the Miharu Board of Education from 1986 to 1989 as an assistant English teacher and still resides in Miharu today.

Noted people from Miharu
Kōno Hironaka, politician
Junko Tabei, mountaineer

Local attractions

Takizakura Park - The name "Miharu" in Japanese means three springs. In most parts of Japan, plum, peach, and cherry trees blossom at different times, but in Miharu, they blossom almost simultaneously. Miharu is home of the Takizakura, or "waterfall cherry tree", is over 1,000 years old and brings tourists from all over Japan to see it in the springtime. It is registered as a living national treasure by the Japanese government.
Site of Miharu Castle

Tradition & Culture 
Miharu-goma

References

External links

  

 
Towns in Fukushima Prefecture